In July and August 1968, the French national rugby union team toured New Zealand and Australia. They played three tests against New Zealand and one against Australia, losing all four.

Results
Scores and results list France's points tally first.

Touring party
Manager: J. C. Bourrier
Assistant Manager: H. Foures
Captain: Christian Carrère (Toulon)

Full backs
Pierre Villepreux (Stade Toulousain), Claude Lacaze (Angoulême)

Three-quarters
André Campaes (Lourdes), Jean-Marie Bonal (Stade Toulousain), Pierre Besson (Brive), Andre Piazza (Montauban), Claude Dourthe (Dax), Jean Trillo (Begles), Joe Maso (Perpignan), Jean-Pierre Lux (Tyrosse)

Half-backs
Christian Boujet (Grenoble), Jean Andrieu (Graulhet), Marcel Puget (Brive), Jean-Louis Berot (Stade Toulousain)

Forwards
Christian Carrère (Toulon), Jean-Jacques Salut (Toulouse O.E.C), Jean-Claude Olivier (Cognac), Michel Billieres (Stade Toulousain), Alain Plantefol (Agen), Walter Spanghero (Narbonne), Élie Cester (Toulouse O.E.C), Michel Greffe (Grenoble), Benoît Dauga (Mont de Marsan), Jean-Claude Noble (La Voulte), Jean-Claude Berejnoi (Tuille), Jean-Michel Esponda (Perpignan), Jean Iracabal, Michel Lasserre (Agen), Jean-Paul Baux (Lannemezan), Michel Yachvili (Tulle)

1968
1968
Rugby union tours of New Zealand
Rugby union tours of Australia
History of rugby union matches between Australia and France
France rugby union tour of New Zealand and Australia
France rugby union tour of New Zealand and Australia
France rugby union tour of New Zealand and Australia